Colturi is a surname. Notable people with the surname include:

 Franco Colturi (born 1970), Italian alpine skier
 Luigi Colturi (1967–2010), Italian alpine skier
 Katia Colturi (born 1971), Italian short track speed skater

Italian-language surnames